Agononida auscerta is a species of squat lobster in the family Munididae. The species name is a combination of Australia and the Latin word incerta, the feminine version of the word incertus, meaning "doubtful".

References

Squat lobsters
Crustaceans described in 2012